Bluvertigo were an Italian alternative rock band from the Milan metropolitan area. Originally formed in 1992 with the name "Golden Age", the band switched to the name Bluvertigo shortly before recording their first album. The founding members are Morgan (Marco Castoldi), Andy (Andrea Fumagalli) and Marco Pancaldi. Drummer Sergio Carnevale joined the band in 1994 while Pancaldi was replaced by Livio Magnini in 1996.

Bluvertigo's first album, Acidi e basi ("Acids and Bases"), was released in 1995. It was followed by Metallo non metallo ("Metal Nonmetal") in 1997 and Zero in 1999. These first three albums were later called "la trilogia chimica" ("the chemical trilogy") because every title has a reference to chemistry and the initial letters (AB-MN-Z) are respectively the first, the central and the last ones of the alphabet. In 2001 Bluvertigo participated to the Sanremo Music Festival with "L'assenzio (The Power of Nothing)". Following the release of the greatest hits album Pop Tools, the band went on hiatus for almost a decade. In 2008 they reunited for a live performance on MTV, an event later documented in the album MTV Storytellers (2008).

In 2003 Morgan released his first solo album: Le canzoni dell'appartamento.

Members
Current members
 Morgan (Marco Castoldi) - lead vocals, bass, keyboards, piano (1992–present)
 Andy (Andrea Fumagalli) - keyboards, saxophone, backing vocals (1992–present)
 Sergio Carnevale - drums, percussions (1996–present)
 Livio Magnini - guitar (1996–present)

Former members
 Marco Pancaldi -  guitar (1992–1996)

Discography
 Acidi e Basi (1995)
 Metallo Non Metallo (1997)
 Zero - ovvero la famosa nevicata dell'85 (1999)
 Pop Tools (2001)
 MTV Storytellers (2008)

Source and external links 
Bluvertigo Myspace
Andy official website
http://www.morganofficial.it/ Morgan official website]

Italian alternative rock groups
Musical groups from Milan
MTV Europe Music Award winners